The 1920 United States Senate special election in Virginia was held on Tuesday November 2. Appointed Senator Carter Glass defeated Republican J. R. Pollard and was elected to finish the term of Democrat Thomas S. Martin, who died the previous year. Glass and fellow Senator Claude A. Swanson were the first U.S. senators to be elected by popular vote (Martin ran unopposed in 1918) following the passage of the 17th Amendment.

Results

References

External links

Virginia
Virginia 1920
1920
1920 Virginia elections
United States Senate 1920
Virginia 1920